Lecanomerus is a genus of beetles in the family Carabidae, containing the following species:

 Lacenomerus aberrans Macleay, 1871 
 Lacenomerus angustior Darlington, 1968 
 Lacenomerus ater (Macleay, 1871) 
 Lacenomerus atriceps (Macleay, 1871) 
 Lacenomerus australis (Blackburn, 1888)  
 Lacenomerus bicolor (Sloane, 1900) 
 Lacenomerus carteri Sloane, 1911
 Lacenomerus concolor (Macleay, 1871) 
 Lacenomerus curtus Sloane, 1911
 Lacenomerus discoidalis (Blackburn, 1888) 
 Lacenomerus domesticus (Montrouzier, 1860) 
 Lacenomerus insignitus Broun, 1880 
 Lacenomerus lateridens (Fauvel, 1882) 
 Lacenomerus latimanus Bates, 1874 
 Lacenomerus latior Darlington, 1968  
 Lacenomerus limbatus Moore, 1967
 Lacenomerus lindi Blackburn, 1888
 Lacenomerus lucidus Sloane, 1917
 Lacenomerus major Blackburn, 1892
 Lacenomerus marrisi Larochelle & Lariviere, 2005 
 Lacenomerus medius Darlington, 1968  
 Lacenomerus niger (Darlington, 1956) 
 Lacenomerus obesulus Bates, 1878 
 Lacenomerus obtusus (Sloane, 1920) 
 Lacenomerus parvicollis (Fauvel, 1882) 
 Lacenomerus recticollis (Macleay, 1888)
 Lacenomerus ruficeps Macleay, 1871
 Lacenomerus scalaris (Fauvel, 1882) 
 Lacenomerus sharpi (Csiki, 1932) 
 Lacenomerus speluncarius (Moore, 1967) 
 Lacenomerus striatus Blackburn, 1892
 Lacenomerus tasmanicus (Bates, 1878) 
 Lacenomerus verticalis (Erichson, 1842) 
 Lacenomerus vestigialis (Erichson, 1842) 
 Lacenomerus victoriensis (Blackburn, 1891)

References

Harpalinae